{{Taxobox
| image =  Spilogona aerea, Morfa Mawddach, North Wales, June 2014 (16180181964).jpg
| image_caption = Spilogona aerea North Wales
| regnum = Animalia
| phylum = Arthropoda
| classis = Insecta
| ordo = Diptera
| subordo = Brachycera
| familia = Muscidae
| genus = Spilogona
| species = 'S. aerea| binomial = Spilogona aerea| binomial_authority = (Fallen, 1825) 
| synonyms = 
}}Spilogona aerea is a fly from the family Muscidae. It is found in the Palearctic .

References

External links
D'Assis Fonseca, E.C.M, 1968 Diptera Cyclorrhapha Calyptrata: Muscidae Handbooks for the Identification of British Insects pdf
Seguy, E. (1923) Diptères Anthomyides. Paris: Éditions Faune de France'' Faune n° 6 393 p., 813 fig.Bibliotheque Virtuelle Numerique  pdf

Muscidae
Diptera of Europe
Insects described in 1825